Christ Episcopal Church is a historic Episcopal church located at 4th and Center Streets in Douglas, Wyoming. Built in 1898, the church is the oldest church in Douglas as well as the only wooden church remaining in the city. G.W.G. Van Winkle designed the church in the Gothic Revival style. The church's design features a bell tower, a steep roof, lancet windows with stained glass, and external buttresses. In addition to its religious function, the church has also hosted community and volunteer groups and social activities.

The church, together with its rectory, was added to the National Register of Historic Places in 1980.

References

External links
 

Episcopal churches in Wyoming
Churches on the National Register of Historic Places in Wyoming
Carpenter Gothic church buildings in Wyoming
Churches completed in 1898
Buildings and structures in Converse County, Wyoming
19th-century Episcopal church buildings
1898 establishments in Wyoming
National Register of Historic Places in Converse County, Wyoming